James Blades OBE (9 September 190119 May 1999) was an English percussionist.

He was one of the most distinguished percussionists in Western music, with a long and varied career. His book Percussion Instruments and their History (1971) is a standard reference work on the subject.

Blades was born in Peterborough in 1901. He was a long-time associate of Benjamin Britten, with whom he conceived many of the composer's unusual percussion effects. In 1954, Blades was appointed Professor of Percussion at the Royal Academy of Music.

As a chamber musician he played with the Melos Ensemble and the English Chamber Orchestra.

Blades' pupils included the rock drummers Max Sedgley, Carl Palmer, and Richard James Burgess as well as percussionist Evelyn Glennie.

His most famous and widely heard performances were the sound of the drum playing "V-for-Victory" in Morse code, the introduction to the BBC broadcasts made to the European Resistance during World War II, and providing the sound of the gong seen at the start of films produced by the Rank Organisation. Blades played this sound on a tam-tam. On screen Blades's sound was mimed to by the "Gongman".

His autobiography Drum Roll: A Professional Adventure from the Circus to the Concert Hall was published by Faber & Faber in 1977.

Bibliography
Orchestral Percussion Techniques (Oxford: University, 1961) 
Percussion Instruments and their History (London: Faber & Faber, 1971) 
Early Percussion Instruments from the Middle Ages to the Baroque (Oxford: University, 1976)  (with Jeremy Montagu)
Drum Roll: A Professional Adventure from the Circus to the Concert Hall (London: Faber & Faber, 1977) 
Ready to Play (London: BBC, 1978)  (with Carole Ward)
From Cave to Cavern (London: Sussex, 1982) 
A Check-List of the Percussion Instruments in the Edinburgh University Collection of Historic Musical Instruments (Edinburgh: Reid School of Music, 1982) 
How to Play Drums (London: Penguin, 1985)  (with Johnny Dean)
These I Have Met... (London: Music Sales, 1998)

References

External links 

 Obituary from The Guardian

1901 births
1999 deaths
Academics of the Royal Academy of Music
Bass drum players
British classical percussionists
Classical percussionists
English classical musicians
Officers of the Order of the British Empire
20th-century classical musicians
20th-century English musicians
20th-century drummers